William and Helen Koerting House is a historic home located at Elkhart, Elkhart County, Indiana.  It was designed by architect Alden B. Dow (1904-1983) and built in 1937.  It is a one- and two-story, International Style stuccoed dwelling.  It features large planes of glass in dark bronze colored frames, a flat roof with copper flashing, and attached garage.

It was added to the National Register of Historic Places in 2009.

References

Houses on the National Register of Historic Places in Indiana
International style architecture in Indiana
Houses completed in 1937
Houses in Elkhart County, Indiana
National Register of Historic Places in Elkhart County, Indiana
1937 establishments in Indiana
Buildings and structures in Elkhart, Indiana